Novobelskoye is a rural locality (a village) in Shigayevsky Selsoviet, Beloretsky District, Bashkortostan, Russia. The population was 136 as of 2010. There are 6 streets.

Geography 
Novobelskoye is located 33 km southwest of Beloretsk (the district's administrative centre) by road. Idel is the nearest rural locality.

References 

Rural localities in Beloretsky District